Hireharakuni is a village in Dharwad district of Karnataka, India.

Demographics 
As of the 2011 Census of India there were 985 households in Hireharakuni and a total population of 4,721 consisting of 2,425 males and 2,296 females. There were 452 children ages 0-6.

References

Villages in Dharwad district